Wiaki, a.k.a. Minidien, is a nearly extinct Torricelli language of Papua New Guinea. The language is spoken in moderation by those residing in the older generations.

References

Maimai languages
Languages of Sandaun Province
Endangered Papuan languages